Kumam Samson Singh (born 1984) is an Indian football player. He played for Air India FC in the I-League in India as a striker.

References

External links
 http://www.goal.com/en-india/people/india/21119/samson-singh

Indian footballers
1984 births
Living people
I-League players
Air India FC players
People from Imphal
Footballers from Manipur
Association football forwards